Captain George Symons VC DCM (18 March 1826 – 18 November 1871) was a British Army officer and an English recipient of the Victoria Cross (VC), the highest and most prestigious award for gallantry in the face of the enemy that can be awarded to British and Commonwealth forces.

Details
Symons was 29 years old, and a sergeant in the Royal Regiment of Artillery, British Army during the Crimean War when the following deed On 6 June 1855 took place at Inkerman, Crimea for which he was awarded the VC.

Later career
Symons was later commissioned into the Military Train, transferred back to the Royal Artillery in 1862 and reached the rank of captain. On 15 January 1862 he was appointed Adjutant of the 1st Administrative Brigade of Yorkshire (East Riding) Artillery Volunteers.

Further information
His medals are held by the Royal Logistic Corps Officers Mess.

Notes

References
Monuments to Courage (David Harvey, 1999)
The Register of the Victoria Cross (This England, 1997)

External links

Location of grave and VC medal (East Yorkshire)

1826 births
1871 deaths
Military personnel from Cornwall
Burials in Yorkshire
People from Cornwall
Royal Artillery soldiers
Royal Artillery officers
Royal Army Service Corps officers
British recipients of the Victoria Cross
Crimean War recipients of the Victoria Cross
British Army personnel of the Crimean War
Recipients of the Distinguished Conduct Medal
Recipients of the Legion of Honour
British Army recipients of the Victoria Cross